Hussein Suleiman Abusalih (5 October 1930 – 6 December 2021) was a Sudanese politician and neurosurgeon. He served as Minister of Foreign Affairs from May 15, 1988, to December 31, 1988, and again from February 13, 1993, to February 9, 1995.

References

1930 births
2021 deaths
Foreign ministers of Sudan
National Congress Party (Sudan) politicians
20th-century Sudanese politicians
Sudanese neurosurgeons